The 2014–15 season of Panathinaikos B.C. is the 52nd season of the basketball club in the highest division of Greek basketball. The club plays its home games at the Olympic Indoor Hall.

Roster

}

Transactions

In

|}

Out

|}

Euroleague

Regular season
Standings

.

References

2014-15
2014–15 in Greek basketball by club
2014–15 Euroleague by club